The 1902 North Dakota gubernatorial election was held on November 4, 1902. Incumbent Republican Frank White defeated Democratic nominee J. Cronan with 62.68% of the vote.

General election

Candidates
Frank White, Republican
J. Cronan, Democratic

Results

References

1902
North Dakota
Gubernatorial